Bijoor railway station is a station on Konkan Railway. It is at a distance of  down from origin. The preceding station on the line is Mookambika Road Byndoor railway station, and the next station is Senapura railway station.

References 

Railway stations along Konkan Railway line
Railway stations in Udupi district
Karwar railway division